Mate Pavić and Michael Venus were the defending champions, but Pavić chose to compete in Sofia instead. Venus played alongside Robert Lindstedt, but lost in the quarterfinals to Alexander and Mischa Zverev.

The Zverev brothers went on to win the title, defeating Fabrice Martin and Daniel Nestor in the final, 6–4, 6–7(3–7), [10–7].

Seeds

Draw

Draw

References 
 Main Draw

Open Sud de France
Doubles